The Zacherl factory (Zacherlfabrik) is a former factory in the 19th district of Vienna, Döbling. It was built in an oriental style.

History 
Johann Zacherl began importing insecticide made from pyrethrum from Tiflis in 1842. In 1870, he started to produce moth powder in Unterdöbling, which he sold under the name Zacherl’s insect-killing tincture (Zacherlin). By 1873, the four employees in his factory were already producing 600 tonnes of Zacherlin per year, which were sold in Zacherl’s shops in Paris, Istanbul, Amsterdam, London, New York and Philadelphia.

In 1880, Zacherl left the company to his son John Evangelist. The factory in Unterdöbling was rebuilt between 1888 and 1892 to produce insecticide. The street-facing administrative wing of the building, which was designed by Karl Mayreder, is a rare example of commercially motivated Orientalism in European architecture. The Yenidze cigarette factory in Dresden is another example of this trend.

The ceramic tiles that were used in the facade and on the roof of the Zacherl factory were produced by the Wienerberger AG.

Johann Evangelist Zacherl expanded the Zacherl company’s activities from the production of insecticide to include the cleaning, repair and storage of fur and rugs. Between 1903 and 1905, he built the Zacherlhaus at the Wildpretmarkt.

Following World War I, sales of insecticide were stunted by expensive import taxes and the growth of chemical industries. After Johann Evangelist Zacherl’s death in 1936, his son Gregor Zacherl took control of the family factory, which from 1933 also produced ski bindings, but in 1949 Gregor Zacherl surrendered his merchant’s licence. He died in 1954 and the name Zacherl was removed from the register of companies in 1958.

The factory building and its gardens stood empty for several decades, until in 2006 Veronika and Peter Zacherl, in cooperation with the Jesuit art fund, opened the former factory up for artistic projects. Since then, exhibitions and music soirees have been held in the building every summer.

References 
 Christine Klusacek, Kurt Stimmer: Döbling. Vom Gürtel zu den Weinbergen. Schmid, Wien 1988, . 
 Stefan Koppelkamm: Exotische Architekturen im 18. und 19. Jahrhundert. Ausstellungskatalog Stuttgart 1987. Ernst, Berlin 1987, . 
 Felix Czeike: Historisches Lexikon Wien, volume 5. Verlag Kremayr & Scheriau, Wien 1997,

External links 

 Offizielle Webseite der Zacherlfabrik 
 Text zur Zacherlfabrik 

Buildings and structures in Döbling
Cultural venues in Vienna